The Butters-Avery House is a historic First Period house located in Wilmington, Massachusetts.

Description and history 
It is a two-story, three bay wide, timber-frame house with an integral rear leanto section. Analysis of its framing suggests that there was probably once a large chimney in the right-hand bay, although there is also some evidence that the house might have been larger, presumably the five bay width of typical colonial houses.

The house was listed on the National Register of Historic Places on July 3, 2010. It was acquired by the town of Wilmington in 2006.

See also
List of the oldest buildings in Massachusetts
National Register of Historic Places listings in Middlesex County, Massachusetts

References

Houses on the National Register of Historic Places in Middlesex County, Massachusetts
Buildings and structures in Wilmington, Massachusetts